2012 UEFA European Under-17 Football Championship elite round was the second round of qualifications for the final tournament of UEFA U-17 Championship 2012. The 28 teams advancing from the qualifying round were distributed into seven groups of four teams each, with each group contesting in a round-robin format, with one of the four teams hosting all six group games. The seven group-winning teams automatically qualified for the final tournament in Slovenia.

Seeding
The draw for the elite round was held on 29 November 2011 in Nyon. Each team was placed in one of four drawing pots, according to their qualifying round results. The seven sides with the best records were placed in Pot A, and so forth until Pot D, which contained the seven teams with the weakest records. During the draw, each group was filled with one team from every pot, with the only restriction being that teams that played each other in the first qualifying round can not be drawn into the same group again.

The hosts of the seven one-venue mini-tournament groups are indicated below in italics.

Group 1

Group 2

Group 3

Group 4

Group 5

Group 6

Group 7
Although Hungary originally won the group on goal difference, Belgium filed a complaint, as Russia had fielded an ineligible player in their match against Belgium. The 1–0 victory by Belgium was therefore replaced with a 3–0 default victory for Belgium, causing them to surpass Hungary in the standings. This decision was appealed by the Hungarian FA.

References

External links
 uefa.com

Qualification
UEFA European Under-17 Championship qualification